Soldiers and Women is a 1930 American pre-Code mystery crime film directed by Edward Sloman and starring Aileen Pringle, Grant Withers and Walter McGrail. Produced by Columbia Pictures, it is based on a 1929 stage play by Paul Hervey Fox and George Tilton. A print is preserved by the Library of Congress.

Synopsis
Captain Clive Branch of the United States Marine Corps is stationed with the garrison in Haiti, where he is conducting affairs with the wives of two fellow officers. When one of the husbands is murdered he comes under suspicion of the killing.

Cast
Aileen Pringle as Brenda Ritchie
Grant Withers as Captain Clive Branch
Judith Wood as Helen Arnold
Walter McGrail as Captain Arnold
Emmett Corrigan as General Mitchell
Blanche Friderici as Martha
Wade Boteler as Sgt. Conlon
Raymond Largay as Colonel Ritchie
William Colvin as Doctor
Sam Nelson as Pvt. Delehanty

References

External links
Soldiers and Women @ IMDb.com

1930 films
Films directed by Edward Sloman
Columbia Pictures films
American films based on plays
American mystery films
Films about the United States Marine Corps
Films set in Haiti
1930s mystery films
American crime films
1930s crime films
American romance films
1930s romance films
1930s American films